WYMA may refer to:

 WYMA-LP, a defunct low-power radio station (97.9 FM) formerly licensed to serve Calhoun, Tennessee, United States
 West Yorkshire Miners' Association, former British trade union